{{DISPLAYTITLE:C16H12O7}}
The molecular formula C16H12O7 (molar mass: 316.26 g/mol, exact mass: 316.058303) may refer to:

 Azaleatin, a flavonol
 Isorhamnetin, a flavonol
 Nepetin, a flavone
 Rhamnetin, a flavonol
 Tamarixetin, a flavonol